Veronica Inglese (born 22 November 1990) is an Italian long-distance runner. She won a silver medal at the 2016 European Athletics Championships.

Biography
In the 5,000m, she won the bronze medal at the 2009 European Junior Championships in Athletics. She won twelve Italian national titles, including four senior (5000m, 10 km road, cross-country and 10,000m track). She has been selected several times on the national team: at the 2011 World Championships, at the 2013 European Cross Country Championships where she finished 8th, and at the 2014 Half Marathon World Championships, among others.

On 1 May 2016, she ran in Palo Alto the 10,000m in 31:42:02, which qualifies her for the Rio Olympics, a time she adds over 5,000m, 15:22:45, 25 June 2016 in Rieti to win the national championship. On 6 July 2016, she finished 6th in the 10,000m European Championships in Amsterdam, beating her personal best, and on 10 July she won the half marathon silver medal behind Sara Moreira.

National titles
She won four national championships at individual senior level in four different specialities.
 Italian Athletics Championships
 5000 m: 2016
 10,000 m: 2014
 10 km road: 2103
 Cross-country running: 2014

References

External links
 

1990 births
Living people
Italian female long-distance runners
Athletes (track and field) at the 2016 Summer Olympics
Olympic athletes of Italy
Athletics competitors of Gruppo Sportivo Esercito
Italian female cross country runners
People from Barletta
Sportspeople from the Province of Barletta-Andria-Trani